Marinens Flyvebaatfabrikk - The Navy's Flying Boat Factory - was the Royal Norwegian Navy Air Service' aeroplane manufacturer. It was established in Horten in 1915 and produced 120 aircraft from then until it ceased to exist in 1940.

Aircraft produced

Local designs

M.F.1, a development of the Maurice Farman MF.7 floatplane, type 1914, six built.
M.F.2, a development of the Maurice Farman MF.11 floatplane, could carry two 50 kg mines/bombs, radio and machine gun.
M.F.3, further development of the MF.11, carried out the first RNoN aircraft test with torpedoes.
M.F.4, the first purpose-built trainer aircraft also developed from the Farman MF.11
M.F.5, the first Norwegian tractor aircraft
M.F.6. a trainer and the last Farman pusher built by the factory 
M.F.7, trainer
8 M.F.8, trainer
10 M.F.9, fighter
4 M.F.10, trainer 
29 M.F.11, reconnaissance
1 M.F.12, monoplane trainer

Built under license
8 Sopwith Baby
7 Douglas DT-2B/C
Hansa-Brandenburg Make, a licence-built Hansa-Brandenburg W.33
6 Make I
24 Make II
11 Make III built at Kjeller Flyfabrikk as the Kjeller F.F.8 Make III.

External links and references

History of the Royal Norwegian Air Force  
Polish page about Norwegian airplanes 

Royal Norwegian Navy Air Service
Aircraft manufacturers of Norway